The 1938 season was the twenty-seventh season for Santos FC.

References

External links
Official Site 

Santos
1938
1938 in Brazilian football